Chresmoda is an extinct genus of insects within the family Chresmodidae.

Description

Chresmoda are large enigmatic insects with very long specialized legs, probably adapted for skating on the water surface similar to pond skaters.

These Polyneoptera of uncertain position have been considered aquatic and living on the water surface, probably predaceous on nektonic small animals.

They lived during the Cretaceous of Brazil, China, Lebanon, Spain, United Kingdom, Mongolia and Myanmar, as well as in the Late Jurassic of Germany, from 150.8 to 94.3 Ma from the Tithonian to the Cenomanian ages. While most species are known from compression fossils, Chresmoda chikuni is known from well preserved 3-dimensional specimens in amber.

Species
Chresmoda aquatica Martinez-Delclos, 1989 La Pedrera de Rubies Formation and Las Hoyas, Spain, Barremian
Chresmoda chikuni Zhang & Ge in Zhang et al., 2017 Burmese amber, Myanmar, Cenomanian
Chresmoda libanica Nel et al., 2004 Sannine Formation, Lebanon, Cenomanian
Chresmoda multinervis Zhang et al., 2009 Dabeigou Formation, China, Early Cretaceous
Chresmoda mongolica Ponomarenko, 1986 Gurvan-Eren Formation, Mongolia, Aptian
Chresmoda neotropica Engel & Heads, 2008 Crato Formation, Brazil, Aptian
These Polyneoptera of uncertain position have been considered aquatic and terrestrial bug or phasmids. They should instead be anomalous paraplecopterids living on the water surface, probably predaceous on nektonic small animals. They lived during the Jurassic of Germany, from 150.8 to 145.5 Ma.
Chresmoda orientalis Esaki, 1949 Yixian Formation, China, Aptian
Chresmoda oweni Westwood, 1854 Purbeck Group, United Kingdom, Berriasian
Chresmoda shihi Zhang et al., 2009 Dabeigou Formation, China, Early Cretaceous

References

External links
Encyclopedia of Life
Lacewing Digital Library

Mesozoic insects of Europe
Prehistoric insect genera
Polyneoptera